"Free" is the first single by Japanese singer Erika Sawajiri under the alias Erika.

Single information
The single was released in two editions: a first press/limited edition and a regular edition. The regular edition contains the B-sides "FANTASY", "Time to go home", and the instrumental for "Free". The first press/limited edition contains the music video for "Free". The album jacket covers for both versions are different.

The single reached number 1 on its first day on the Oricon charts and obtained the same spot in its first week. The song "Free" was used for the commercial promoting Subaru Stella and R2. The b-side song, "Fantasy", was used as the song in the commercial promoting music.jp.

Track list

Charts

Oricon Sales Chart (Japan)

References

External links
 Erika - Official Website
 Oricon Website

2007 singles
Oricon Weekly number-one singles
2007 songs